The 1938 South Carolina Gamecocks football team was an American football team that represented the University of South Carolina as a member of the Southern Conference (SoCon) during the 1938 college football season. In their first season under head coach Rex Enright, the Gamecocks compiled an overall record of 6–4–1 with a mark of 2–2 in conference play, tying for sixth place in the SoCon.

Schedule

References

South Carolina
South Carolina Gamecocks football seasons
South Carolina Gamecocks football